North Carolina Highway 66 (NC 66) is a  North Carolina state highway that travels from Horneytown to Johnstown, connecting the towns and communities of eastern Forsyth and Stokes counties.

Route description
NC 66 begins at exit 63 of I-74 in Horneytown. From there, the highway continues north and meets I-40 at exit 203. After NC 66 crosses over US 421 and it passes an intersection with NC 150 in Kernersville. NC 66 continues northwest towards Rural Hall. Once NC 66 reaches Rural Hall, it runs parallel to US 52 until King. South of King NC 66 heads north towards Gap. The highway then runs through the mountains of curvy roads until reaching its northern terminus at a Y-intersection with NC 89.

History

The first NC 66 was an original state highway. It began at NC 60 and NC 65 the current intersection of 4th Street and Cherry Street in Winston-Salem. NC 66 then headed north along today's University Parkway to Stanleyville. From there, NC 66 continues up to Pilot Mountain. In late 1921, NC 66 was extended to NC 89, in Westfield. In 1922, NC 66 was rerouted to Mount Airy. Then NC 66 went north to the Virginia state line. In 1923, NC 66 was rerouted to go from Mount Airy to Virginia State Route 15 at the state line. In 1925, NC 66 was rerouted to follow Patterson Avenue into Winston-Salem. From there, NC 66 replaced NC 64 to Lexington. In 1926, US 121 was assigned the entire routing of NC 66. In 1934, US 52 replaced both US 121 and NC 66 in entirety. The current NC 66 was designated in late 1934 as a renumbering of NC 661. It went from US 52 (old NC 66) in Rural Hall to NC 89 to the north. In 1936, NC 66 was routed along US 52 to Stanleyville. Then NC 66 was extended to US 421 (current Old Greensboro Road) along new routing. Between 1947 and 1949, NC 66 was routed south of Walkertown. In 1955, NC 66 was extended along US 421 to Kernersville and then on new primary routing to US 311.

North Carolina Highway 64

North Carolina Highway 64 (NC 64) was an original state highway that traversed from NC 10, in Lexington, north to NC 60/NC 77 (Waughtown Street), in Winston-Salem. In 1925, NC 64 was renumbered as an extension of NC 66.

In 1932, NC 64 reappeared as a mostly new primary routing; except around Coleridge, where it replaced part of NC 902.  It traversed from US 421/NC 60 (Liberty Road), in Greensboro, going southeast through Climax, Franklinville, Ramseur, Coleridge and Bennett, to NC 74 (today NC 24/NC 27), west of Carthage.  In late 1934, NC 64 was renumbered as NC 22.

North Carolina Highway 661

North Carolina Highway 661 (NC 661) was an original state highway that traversed from NC 66, in King, to NC 89, in Moores Springs. In 1923, NC 661 was extended northwest along NC 89 to Francisco, then replaced NC 893 to the Virginia state line. In 1924, NC 661 was rerouted at Gap to NC 89 west of Francisco then east along NC 89 to Francisco before continuing to the state line, leaving behind Moore Springs Road (SR 1001). In 1926, NC 661 was rerouted on both ends: south-end to NC 66, in Rural Hall, and north-end being truncated at NC 89, in the Johnstown community; its old segment northeast of NC 89 became a secondary road, later becoming part of NC 704. In 1935, NC 661 was renumbered as part of NC 66.

Major intersections

See also
 North Carolina Bicycle Route 4 - concurrent with NC 66 from Gap to NC 268

References

External links

NCRoads.com: N.C. 64
NCRoads.com: N.C. 66
NCRoads.com: N.C. 661

066
Transportation in Forsyth County, North Carolina
Transportation in Stokes County, North Carolina